Tinea prensoria is a moth of the family Tineidae. It is known from Chile.

This species has a wingspan of 14–15 mm.

References

Tineinae
Moths described in 1931
Moths of South America
Endemic fauna of Chile